Hilltop is a populated place situated in Springfield Township in Bucks County, Pennsylvania.

References

Populated places in Bucks County, Pennsylvania